The Tallassee Mills were cotton mills established by the Tallassee Falls Manufacturing Company in 1841 in Tallassee, Alabama at the falls of the Tallapoosa River. At the time of their closure in 2005, the Tallassee Mills were the oldest continuously operating textile mills in the United States.

The mills were placed on the National Register of Historic Places on April 26, 2010.

References

External links
 

Historic districts on the National Register of Historic Places in Alabama
Buildings and structures completed in 1844
Elmore County, Alabama
Historic American Buildings Survey in Alabama
National Register of Historic Places in Elmore County, Alabama